Donald James "Don" Grierson (born June 16, 1947) is a former Canadian professional ice hockey player in the World Hockey Association (WHA).

Born  in Toronto, Ontario, Grierson played junior ice hockey for the North Bay Trappers. After one season of junior, he was drafted in the third round (23rd overall) of the 1968 NHL Amateur Draft by the Montreal Canadiens of the National Hockey League (NHL). Though he was drafted into the NHL, he never played a game there. He spent most of his career in the minors and two seasons (1972–73 and 1973–74) in the World Hockey Association, playing for the Houston Aeros.

External links

1947 births
Baltimore Clippers players
Baltimore Clippers (SHL) players
Canadian ice hockey forwards
Houston Aeros (WHA) players
Living people
Montreal Canadiens draft picks
Ice hockey player-coaches
Southern Hockey League (1973–1977) coaches
Ice hockey people from Toronto